There are 16 statistical metropolitan areas in Norway, of which six count as "Greater City Regions" (Storbyregioner) and ten as "City Regions" (Byregioner). The classification comes from Storbymeldingen (The Greater City Report) from the Norwegian Ministry of Local Government and Regional Development. This report was composed in 2002–2003 to create a coherent policy for the development of metropolitan areas within Norwegian society. It was presented by then Minister of Local Government and Regional Development Erna Solberg on 12 March 2003. The Greater City Regions contain cities with numbers of inhabitants ranging from around 60,000 to 1.4 million, while the City Regions range from around 45 to 175 thousand. This is out of a national population of around 5.2 million citizens.

The three most populous regions are the Greater Oslo Region, the Greater Bergen Region, and the Greater Stavanger Region.

Greater City Regions
Six Norwegian cities are considered Greater Cities (Storbyer). This classification is the result of an overall evaluation of these cities' population and their importance as regional centres. The six cities are Oslo, Bergen, Trondheim, Stavanger, Kristiansand and Tromsø. According to Storbymeldingen, these regions contained the following number of municipalities and inhabitants as of 1 July 2009 (the right-hand column shows the number of inhabitants in the main city, within the boundaries of its municipality):

City Regions
In addition to these six regions, there are ten lesser regions referred to as City Regions (Byregioner). The City Regions of Drammen and Moss are for many purposes considered part of the Greater Oslo Region, bringing the number down to eight. The City Regions, according to the same report, are the following (these regions do not all contain one, main city, so here this category is not included):

See also
 Counties of Norway
 List of municipalities of Norway
 List of towns and cities in Norway
 Regions of Norway

References

 
Norway
Norway geography-related lists
Lists of populated places in Norway